"J'adore Hardcore" is a single by German hard dance group Scooter. It was released as the first single from their 2009 album Under the Radar Over the Top on 14 August 2009. Record label All Around the World released the single in the UK on 2 November 2009.

Track listings
CD single

CD single (2-track)

12"

Download

Music video

The video for the single features footage of a live Scooter concert in Differdange (Luxembourg), dancers Pae (Missaghi Peyman) and Sarah Miatt performing the Melbourne Shuffle on the streets of Melbourne (Australia) and car scenes of H.P. Baxxter, the frontman of Scooter, recorded on Majorca (Spain).

On 30 July 2009, during the video shoot, H. P. Baxxter was almost a victim of a car bomb attack. Band member Michael Simon posted on his Myspace page that Baxxter was not injured in the attack. According to Simon a theft occurred, and Baxxter went to report it to the police. When the police sent him away to find a translator from German to Spanish, Baxxter left, and within minutes the bomb exploded.

The video premiered on the website of Kontor Records on 7 August 2009. An extended version of the video was released to coincide with the single on 13 August 2009. This was the first extended video released by Scooter.

Samples
The spoken words "J'adore hardcore" in the track are performed by French fan Maddy Julien. Julien was contacted via the social networking site Facebook, and was asked to record the sample. She was the first French vocalist in any Scooter song.
The chorus melody in "J'adore Hardcore" samples the song "Alla Luce Del Giorno" by Ennio Morricone, taken from the 1969 film "Metti, una sera a cena".
"J'adore Hardcore" samples the 2009 song "Lullaby" by Activator and uses a sample that is heavily inspired by the melody of the track "I Just Can't Stop" by The Pitcher. The refrain is inspired by "Düp Düp" by Mickie Krause ("Düp Düp" also samples "Chase The Sun" by Planet Funk). "Düp Düp" was inspired by the Scooter track "The Shit That Killed Elvis", taken from the 2007 album The Ultimate Aural Orgasm. A small part of the lyrics in the beginning of the track are taken from "Proud To Be Loud" by Tat & Zat (AKA Tatanka and Zatox).
"Dushbag" also samples "Lullaby" by Activator, and Scooter's song "This Is A Monstertune" from their 1996 album Our Happy Hardcore.
One sound effect in the song was taken from Trans-X's song Living on Video (the chip type effect).
A voice saying "Ah yeah" is sampled from Here We Go by Run–D.M.C. live at the Funhouse.

Chart performance

References

2009 singles
Scooter (band) songs
Hardstyle songs
Songs written by H.P. Baxxter
2009 songs
Songs written by Jens Thele
Songs written by Michael Simon (DJ)
Songs written by Rick J. Jordan